ID:A is a 2011 thriller film directed by Christian E. Christiansen and starring Tuva Novotny.

Cast
 Tuva Novotny - Aliena / Ida
 Flemming Enevold - Just
 Carsten Bjørnlund - Martin 
 Arnaud Binard - Pierre 
 John Buijsman - Rob 
 Rogier Philipoom - Guus 
 Jens Jørn Spottag - HP 
 Marie Louise Wille - Marietta 
 Françoise Lebrun - Isabelle
 Koen Wouterse - Tim

Awards and nominations
ID:A was nominated for three Robert Awards, for Best Actress, Best Editor, and Best Special Effects, but lost out to Melancholia in all three categories.

References

External links
 
 

2011 films
2010s thriller films
2010s Danish-language films
Films based on Danish novels
Films directed by Christian E. Christiansen
Danish thriller films
Films produced by Louise Vesth